The Party for Democracy and Social Progress  (Parti pour la Démocratie et le Progrès Social) is a political party of Benin. In the parliamentary election held on 31 March 2007, the party won one out of 83 seats.

References

Political parties in Benin
Political parties with year of establishment missing